St. Katherine's Priory also known as The Priory of Saint Katherine without Lincoln was a Gilbertine priory  of Canons Regular on the Fosse Way just outside the walls of Lincoln, England. The Priory ran the Hospital of St Sepulchre, probably the first hospital in the city.

History

The community which followed the Rule of Saint Augustine was founded not long after the approval of St Gilbert's order in 1148 when Robert de Chesney invited them to minister in the city. The Priory and Church came with The Hospital of Saint Sepulchre which had been established by Bishop of Lincoln Robert Bloet sometime between 1093 and 1123. The community was chiefly male, made up of around 16 Canons, but there is evidence of a number of female lay sisters living alongside to help with medical care in the hospital.

The community was under the patronage of Saint Catherine of Alexandria, a  fourth century Egyptian missionary, philosopher and martyr, the patron saint of learning and the dying. The key figures were the prior, the sub-prior, the cellarer, precentor, and the sacrist. In addition to the duties of singing the eight daily Liturgies of the Hours and the Conventual Mass in the priory church the Canons also had responsibility for the care of numerous other parishes. These included the prebendary of Canwick, the Parish of St Mary Magdalene, Newark-on-Trent, and the chapel in Newark Castle, as well as the parishes or Rectories of Alford with Rigsby Chapel, Bracebridge, Hackthorn, Harmston, Friskney, Marton, Mere, Newton on Trent, North Hykeham Norton Disney, Saxby and Stapleford. Ministry in these parishes would largely have been left to hired secular clergy but some of the closer villages like Bracebridge may have been under the direct auspicies of the Canons. A large part of their time would have been spent hearing the Confessions of the sick, ministering Last Rites to the dying, and praying for the needs of the community at large. In 1291 Pope Nicholas IV granted a spiritual Indulgence to anyone who made pilgrimage to the Priory on St Catherine's, St Gilbert's, and St James's feast days.

As well as the prime focus of medical, pastoral, and spiritual care the community had a number of agricultural land endowments. In 1285 a windmill was constructed next to the main priory site and in 1306 an aqueduct. By 1535, a few years before the dissolution, these included the granges or manors of Belchford, Cherry Willingham, Harmston, Long Bennington,  North Hykeham, Stapleford, Saxby, and Wellingore; in Nottinghamshire, Coddington, and in Yorkshire Brampton. St Katherine's also held other lands and rents in Lincolnshire, as well as gaining income from the parish churches  listed above. The main product of their estates was wool with an average output of 35 sacks per year in the 14th century. In spite of the communities fairly large income comparative to other Gilbertine houses the costs of the hospital continually threatened to overwhelm income. For this reason the community had the right to send out collectors and Bishop John Dalderby granted an Indulgence for all donations to Saint Sepulchre's Hospital.

The house was dissolved on the 14th July, 1538, two months before the other Gilbertine houses in the county. The thirteen canons were pensioned, but the lay sisters got nothing.

The site of the priory church is now home to the parish church for the St Catherine's area of Lincoln.

Queen Eleanor and the Priory

On the night of the 2nd of December 1290 the body of Queen Eleanor of Castile, wife of King Edward the First, rested at the Priory of Saint Katherine on the first of twelve days journey to Westminster Abbey. The following year, the King had Commorative Crosses built at each location on the journey including outside the gatehouse of St Katherine's. Eleanor's viscera were entombed at Lincoln Cathedral, so it is likely that the embalming process happened at the Priory given the expertise available due to St Sepulchre's medical practice.

List of Priors of Saint Katherine without Lincoln

Adam, occurs 1164

Gilbert, 1202-1218

William, 1218-1225

Vivian, 1225-1232

Hugh, 1232-1236

Roger, 1236-1245

Ralph, 1245-1269

Henry, 1269-

Gilbert, occurs 1323

William, 1333-1334

Richard de Stretton, 1334-1334

Walter de Shireburn, 1334-1340

Robert de Navenby, 1340-1344

William, 1344-1348

Roger de Houton, 1348-1390

Hamo, 1390-

Walter Iklyngham, occurs 1428 and 1435

Richard Misyn, 1435-1447

John Busseby, 1447-

Robert, occurs 1511

John Jonson, occurs 1522

Robert Holgate, occurs 1529

William Griffiths, occurs 1538

References

https://www.british-history.ac.uk/vch/lincs/vol2/pp188-191

Monasteries in Lincolnshire
History of Lincoln, England